José Jaime Galeano (22 December 1945 – July 2021) was a Colombian cyclist. He competed at the 1968 Summer Olympics and the 1976 Summer Olympics.

References

External links
 

1945 births
2021 deaths
Colombian male cyclists
Olympic cyclists of Colombia
Cyclists at the 1968 Summer Olympics
Cyclists at the 1976 Summer Olympics
Sportspeople from Antioquia Department
Pan American Games medalists in cycling
Pan American Games bronze medalists for Colombia
Cyclists at the 1971 Pan American Games
20th-century Colombian people
21st-century Colombian people